Malcolm Graeme Wright (2 June 1926 - 20 December 1996) was a Sri Lankan former first-class cricketer.

The son of Oswin Ansbert Wright, a member of an Anglo–Burgher family, he was born in British Ceylon at Kandy in June 1926. He later studied in England at St Catherine's College at the University of Oxford. While studying at Oxford, he made two appearances in first-class cricket for Oxford University in 1950, against Warwickshire and Lancashire at Oxford. He scored 35 runs in his two matches, with a high score of 17.

References

External links

1926 births
1996 deaths
People from Kandy
Sri Lankan people of Dutch descent
Sri Lankan people of English descent
Alumni of St Catherine's College, Oxford
Sri Lankan cricketers
Oxford University cricketers
Burgher sportspeople
People from British Ceylon